José David de Gea Tudela (born 9 December 1977) is a Spanish motorcycle racer. He has competed at international level in the 125cc, 250cc, 500cc and MotoGP classes of Grand Prix motorcycle racing, the Supersport World Championship and the Superbike World Championship.

At national level de Gea won the CEV Fórmula Extreme title four times—in 2003, 2005, 2006 and 2007.

Career statistics

Grand Prix motorcycle racing

By season

Races by year
(key) (Races in bold indicate pole position, races in italics indicate fastest lap)

Supersport World Championship

Races by year
(key) (Races in bold indicate pole position) (Races in italics indicate fastest lap)

Superbike World Championship

Races by year
(key) (Races in bold indicate pole position) (Races in italics indicate fastest lap)

References

External links
 

1977 births
Living people
Sportspeople from the Region of Murcia
Spanish motorcycle racers
125cc World Championship riders
250cc World Championship riders
500cc World Championship riders
MotoGP World Championship riders
Superbike World Championship riders
Supersport World Championship riders